Alexa Mercedes Pacheco González (born 6 November 2002) is a Dominican footballer who plays as a defender for Delfines del Este FC and the Dominican Republic women's national team.

International career
Goldey Beacom Women's Soccer team (2021). Pacheco has appeared for the Dominican Republic at the 2020 CONCACAF Women's Olympic Qualifying Championship qualification.

References 

2002 births
Living people
Dominican Republic women's footballers
Women's association football defenders
Dominican Republic women's international footballers
Dominican Republic expatriate women's footballers
Dominican Republic expatriate sportspeople in the United States
Expatriate women's soccer players in the United States